The 1997–98 Russian Superleague season was the second season of the Russian Superleague, the top level of ice hockey in Russia. 28 teams participated in the league, and Ak Bars Kazan won the championship. HC Metallurg Magnitogorsk won the Russian Cup.

Regular season

Western Conference

Eastern Conference

Final round

Russian Cup (Playoffs)

Relegation

External links
Season on hockeyarchives.ru

Russian Superleague seasons
1997–98 in Russian ice hockey leagues